Musashi Kanbe (born January 16, 1948, in Ishikawa Prefecture) is a Seiun Award winning author for the novel Saikoro Tokkōtai. Kanbe was also chair of honor at Daicon III in 1981.

References

External links
Entry in The Encyclopedia of Science Fiction

Japanese science fiction writers
Writers from Hyōgo Prefecture
1948 births
Living people
20th-century Japanese writers